A Taiga Story is a 1979 Soviet drama film directed by Vladimir Fetin.

Plot 
The film tells about the taiga hunter Akim, who meets a dying girl and decides to save her. Having regained consciousness, she falls in love with Akim, but they are too different.

Cast 
 Yevgeny Kindinov as Goga Gertsev
 Mikhail Kononov as Akim
 Svetlana Smekhnova as Elya

References

External links 
 

1979 films
1970s Russian-language films
Soviet drama films
1979 drama films